The Ocean Stakes (Japanese オーシャンステークス) is a Grade 3 horse race for Thoroughbreds aged four and over, run in March over a distance of 1200 metres on turf at Nakayama Racecourse.

The Ocean Stakes was first run in 1996 and has held Grade 3 status since 2009. It serves as a trial race for the Takamatsunomiya Kinen.

Winners since 2009

See also
 Horse racing in Japan
 List of Japanese flat horse races

References

Turf races in Japan